The 25th European Trampoline Championships were held in Valladolid, Spain, from March 31 – April 3, 2016.

Medal summary

Medal table

Results

References

External links

European Trampoline Championships
2016
2016 in Spanish sport
International gymnastics competitions hosted by Spain